The CBR Brave are an Australian ice hockey franchise that compete in the Australian Ice Hockey League (AIHL). The Brave are based in Australia’s capital city, Canberra, and to date have played all its home games at Phillip Ice Centre since its founding in 2014.  In four completed seasons, the team has yet to win a Goodall Cup championship and has qualified for the AIHL finals weekend four times. As of the end of the 2017 season, the Brave have won more than 50 regular-season games, scored more than 490 regular-season goals and accumulated more than 190 regular-season points.

CBR won their first major title in 2018 by clinching the H Newman Reid Trophy by finishing first in the 2018 AIHL regular-season standings.

Table Legend

Year by Year

Notes

References

 
Australian Ice Hockey League seasons
Australia sport-related lists
Ice hockey-related lists
Canberra-related lists